Mohammad Mehdi Ahmadi is an Iranian football left back who currently plays for Naft MIS (on loan) in the Persian Gulf Pro League.

Club career

Persepolis 
On June 12, 2022; Ahmadi joined Persepolis with a 3-year contract.

Club career statistics

References

External links 
 

Living people
2001 births
Association football defenders
Iranian footballers
Naft Masjed Soleyman F.C. players
People from Malayer
Persepolis F.C. players